= Chasing Love =

2005 French TV film directed by Laurence Katrian

- À la poursuite de l'amour
- Directed by: Laurence Katrian
- Country of origin: France
- Original language: French

Original release
- Release: 2005

Chasing Love (Original title: À la poursuite de l'amour) is a French television film directed by Laurence Katrian. This comedy-romance film was first broadcast in 2005 on TF1.

== Synopsis ==
When Camille, a young heiress who inherited her father's fortune as well as his cosmetics business, returns from a business trip, she finds that her boyfriend Vincent has callously walked out on her, without even so much as leaving her a note. She meets Zac, a writer whose former lover is who Vincent left Camille for. The two jilted souls team up with a mission to break up the new union of their former lovers.

== Awards ==
Chasing Love won the Prix de la meilleure comédie au Festival de Luchon in 2005.
